The New-York Manumission Society was an American organization founded in 1785 by U.S. Founding Father John Jay, among others, to promote the gradual abolition of slavery and manumission of slaves of African descent within the state of New York. The organization was made up entirely of white men, most of whom were wealthy and held influential positions in society. Throughout its history, which ended in 1849 after the abolition of slavery in New York, the society battled against the slave trade, and for the eventual emancipation of all the slaves in the state.  It founded the African Free School for the poor and orphaned children of slaves and free people of color.

Founding
The New-York Manumission Society was founded in 1785, under the full name "The New-York Society for Promoting the Manumission of Slaves, and Protecting Such of Them as Have Been, or May be Liberated". The organization originally comprised a few dozen friends, many of whom were themselves slaveholders at the time. The members were motivated in part by the rampant kidnapping of free blacks from the streets of New York, who were then sold into slavery. Several of the members were Quakers.

Robert Troup presided over the first meeting, which was held on January 25, 1785, at the home of John Simmons, who had space for the nineteen men in attendance since he kept an inn. Troup, who owned two slaves, and Melancton Smith were appointed to draw up rules, and John Jay, who owned five slaves, was elected as the Society's first president.

At the second meeting, held on February 4, 1785, the group grew to 31 members, including Alexander Hamilton.

The Society formed a ways-and-means committee to deal with the difficulty that more than half of the members, including Troup and Jay, owned slaves (mostly a few domestic servants per household). The committee reported a plan for gradual emancipation: members would free slaves then younger than 28 when they reached the age of 35, slaves between 28 and 38 in seven years' time, and slaves over 45 immediately. This was voted down, and the committee was dissolved.

Activities

Lobbying and boycotts
John Jay had been a prominent leader in the antislavery cause since 1777, when he drafted a state law to abolish slavery in New York. The draft failed, as did a second attempt in 1785. In 1785, all state legislators except one voted for some form of gradual emancipation. However, they did not agree on what civil rights would be given to the slaves once they were freed.

Jay brought prominent political leaders into the Society, and also worked closely with Aaron Burr, later head of the Democratic-Republicans in New York. The Society started a petition against slavery, which was signed by almost all the politically prominent men in New York, of all parties and led to a bill for gradual emancipation.   Burr, in addition to supporting the bill, made an amendment for immediate abolition, which was voted down.

The Society was instrumental in having a state law passed in 1785 prohibiting the sale of slaves imported into the state, and making it easy for slaveholders to manumit slaves either by a registered certificate or by will. In 1788 the purchase of slaves for removal to another state was forbidden; they were allowed trial by jury "in all capital cases;" and the earlier laws about slaves were simplified and restated.  The emancipation of slaves by the Quakers was legalized in 1798.  At that date, there were still about 33,000 slaves statewide.

The Society organized boycotts against New York merchants and newspaper owners involved in the slave trade. The Society had a special committee of militants who visited newspaper offices to warn publishers against accepting advertisements for the purchase or sale of slaves.

Another committee kept a list of people who were involved in the slave trade, and urged members to boycott anyone listed. According to historian Roger Kennedy:

Accomplishments and legacy

African Free School 

In 1787, the Society founded the African Free School.

Legislation
Beginning in 1785, the Society lobbied for a state law to abolish slavery in the state, as all the other northern states (except New Jersey) had done.  Considerable opposition came from the Dutch areas upstate (where slavery was still popular), as well as from the many businessmen in New York who profited from the slave trade. The two houses passed different emancipation bills and could not reconcile them. Every member of the New York legislature but one voted for some form of gradual emancipation, but no agreement could be reached on the civil rights of freedmen afterwards.

Some measure of success finally came in 1799 when John Jay, as Governor of New York State, signed the Act for the Gradual Abolition of Slavery into law; however it still ignored the subject of civil rights for freed slaves. The resulting legislation declared that, from July 4 of that year, all children born to slave parents would be free. It also outlawed the exportation of current slaves to other states. However, the Act held the caveat that the children would be subject to apprenticeship. These same children would be required to serve their mother's owner until age twenty-eight for males, and age twenty-five for females. The law defined the children of slaves as a type of indentured servant, while scheduling them for eventual freedom.

Another law was passed in 1817:

The last slaves in New York were emancipated by July 4, 1827; the process was the largest emancipation in North America before 1861. Although the law as written did not set free those born between 1799 and 1817, many still children, public sentiment in New York had changed between 1817 and 1827, enough so that in practice they were set free as well. The press referred to it as a "General Enancipation". An estimated 10,000 enslaved New Yorkers were freed in 1827.

Thousands of freedmen celebrated with a parade in New York. The parade was deliberately held on July 5, not the 4th.

Contrasts to other anti-slavery efforts 
The Society was founded to address slavery in the state of New York, while other anti-slavery societies directed their attention to slavery as a national issue. The Quakers of New York petitioned the First Congress (under the Constitution) for the abolition of the slave trade. In addition, Benjamin Franklin and the Pennsylvania Abolition Society petitioned for the abolition of slavery in the new nation, while the New York Manumission Society did not act. Hamilton and others believed that Federal action on slavery would endanger the compromise worked out at the Constitutional Convention, and, by extension, would endanger the new United States.

See also
American Colonization Society
:Category:Members of the New York Manumission Society
Phoenix Society (New York)

Notes

Further reading

External links 
 The Records of the New-York Manumission Society 1785–1849 at the New York Historical Society
 Records of the New-York Manumission Society
 Jay Heritage Center
 Memorials of Peter A. Jay

Abolitionism in the United States
American abolitionist organizations
African-American history of New York (state)
Organizations established in 1785
1849 disestablishments in New York (state)
1785 establishments in New York (state)
18th century in New York City
19th century in New York City